This incomplete list lists earthquakes that had epicentres within the current borders of Slovenia or otherwise had a significant impact on Slovenia.

See also 
 List of earthquakes in Croatia
 List of earthquakes in Italy

References 

 
Earthquakes
Slovenia
Earthquakes